Gauhar Ara Begum (17 June 1631 –  1706) was a Mughal princess and the fourteenth and youngest child of the Mughal emperor Shah Jahan and his wife Mumtaz Mahal.

Her mother died giving birth to her in 1631. Gauhar Ara, however, survived the childbirth and lived for another three quarters of a century. Little is known about her and whether she was involved in the war of succession for her father's throne.

Gauhar Ara died in 1706, aged about 75.

Life
Born on 17 June 1631, the day her mother Mumtaz Mahal died, Gauhar Ara Begum appears to have kept a fairly low profile throughout the reigns of her father and brother. Evidence vaguely indicates that she may have supported her fourth brother Murad Bakhsh's bid for the throne during the War of Succession. Were this to be true, this role was unlikely to have been particularly active since, unlike her father and sister Jahanara, she was not imprisoned afterwards by her victorious brother Aurangzeb.

She, following her father's downfall, involve herself in the organising of the marriages of her relations. When Sipihr Shikoh, son of her eldest brother Dara married Aurangzeb's daughter Zubdat-un-Nissa in 1673, Gauhar Ara and her maternal cousin Hamida Banu Begum arranged the wedding ceremony. She had taken a greater role in 1672 with the marriage of Dara's granddaughter Salima Banu Begum (whom Gauhar Ara had adopted and raised) and Aurangzeb's fourth son Prince Muhammad Akbar. She took the place of the bride's mother, with the wedding being described as a gala event: "On both sides of the road from the Delhi gate to the mansion of the Begum (i.e. Gauhar Ara) wooden structures were set up for illumination."

Death

Gauhar Ara Begum died in Shahjahanabad in 1706. Aurangzeb, who was stationed in the Deccan at the time, was stricken by the death. He was reported to have continuously repeated "Of all the children of Shah Jahan, she and I alone were left."

Ancestry

In popular culture
Gauhar Ara Begum is a principal character in Ruchir Gupta's novel Mistress of the Throne (2014).

References

Mughal princesses
People from Agra
Mughal nobility
1631 births
1706 deaths
17th-century Indian monarchs
17th-century Indian Muslims
Women of the Mughal Empire
People from Burhanpur
Indian people of Iranian descent
Daughters of emperors